The Montana Department of Corrections is a state agency of Montana that operates state prisons and manages community-corrections programs. The agency has its headquarters in Helena.

Adult secure facilities 
Male
 Montana State Prison (Unincorporated Powell County, near Deer Lodge)
Private/regional prisons for men
 Cascade County Regional Prison (Great Falls)
 Crossroads Correctional Facility (Unincorporated Toole County, near Shelby), privately operated by the Corrections Corporation of America
 Dawson County Correctional Facility (Glendive)

Female
 Montana Women's Prison (Billings)

Adult Community Corrections 
Operated by the state, county government or private nonprofits under contract with the state.
 Missoula Assessment and Sanction Center, Missoula
 Nexus Meth Treatment Center (males), Lewistown
 Elkhorn Meth Treatment Center (females), Boulder
 START revocation and sanction center, Anaconda
 Connections Corrections, Butte and Warm Springs
 WATCh DUI treatment program, Warm Springs and Glendive
 Treasure State Correctional Training Center (boot camp), Deer Lodge
 Passages Women's Center, Billings
 Pine Hills Correctional Facility, Miles City
 Prerelease centers in Billings, Bozeman, Butte, Great Falls, Helena and Missoula
 Probation and parole offices in 23 communities

Youth Services Division 
The Youth Services Division operates juvenile correctional facilities. Pine Hills Youth Correctional Facility in unincorporated Custer County, near Miles City, serves delinquent boys. Riverside Youth Correctional Facility, a 20-bed facility for girls, is located in Boulder.

Youth Community Corrections 
The Youth Community Corrections Bureau forms the youth parole network.

 Youth Transition Centers, Great Falls
 Juvenile parole

See also 
 List of law enforcement agencies in Montana
 List of United States state correction agencies
 List of U.S. state prisons

References

External links 
Montana Department of Corrections
 Biennial Report 2011

State law enforcement agencies of Montana
State corrections departments of the United States
Lists of United States state prisons
 
Juvenile detention centers in the United States